Thomas Bennett (November 14, 1835 – January 27, 1908) was an Irish-born Canadian politician. He served as the first mayor of Strathcona, Alberta.

Bennett was born in Ireland in 1835. After immigrating to Canada, he served on the city council and as mayor of Bury, Quebec. He was also a warden in Compton County, Quebec. Bennett moved to Strathcona in 1895 as an immigration agent. Upon Strathcona's incorporation as a town, Bennett would be elected as the town's first mayor in an election with around 700 votes cast. His council would consist of prominent Strathcona residents, including future Premier of Alberta, Alexander Cameron Rutherford. As mayor, Bennett took a conservative approach to affairs, in hopes of preventing debt to the town. He was an early pioneer of the education system in Strathcona, serving on the town's school board as a trustee which also included a stint as chairman. He died at his home in Strathcona in 1908 after a long illness; his body would later be taken by train to Sherbrooke, Quebec for interment after his funeral in Strathcona, which was attended by many citizens, as well as the incumbent city council and mayor. At the time of his death, he was serving as immigration agent for Strathcona once again. Built in 1912, the Bennett Centre, formerly known as Bennett School, which is located in present-day Edmonton, is named in Thomas Bennett's honour.

References

Bibliography

1835 births
1908 deaths
Mayors of places in Alberta
19th-century Canadian politicians